Zachary J. Collaros (born August 27, 1988) is an American professional Canadian football quarterback for the Winnipeg Blue Bombers of the Canadian Football League (CFL). Collaros won the 107th Grey Cup and 108th Grey Cup as the starting quarterback with the Blue Bombers when they defeated the Hamilton Tiger-Cats in both games. He had previously won the Grey Cup as the backup quarterback with the Toronto Argonauts in the 100th Grey Cup. Collaros played football at the University of Cincinnati, and has also been a member of the Tampa Bay Buccaneers, Hamilton Tiger-Cats, Saskatchewan Roughriders and Toronto Argonauts.

Early years
Collaros graduated from Steubenville (Ohio) High School in 2007, after leading the Big Red to Division III state titles in the 2005 & 2006 seasons, ending with an undefeated 30-0 record as a starter.

College career
Collaros was one of five quarterbacks to play for the Bearcats during the 2008 season. After Tony Pike was injured in the Akron game, Collaros took his first snap as college quarterback halfway through the fourth quarter. On the season, he had one completion on four attempts for a total of two yards. He also rushed 6 times for a total of 29 yards.

When Pike was injured midway through the 2009 season, during a game against South Florida, Collaros again took over; on his third snap, he ran for a key 75-yard touchdown. He went on to start the next four games while Pike recovered from a broken arm.   During week 10, Collaros won Big East Offensive Player of the Week, after racking up a Big East record 555 yards of total offense (480 passing, 75 rushing) and accounting for three touchdowns (one passing, two rushing) in a 48–45 win over Connecticut.  In four starts, the second half of the USF game, and several "cameo appearances," Collaros racked up relatively big numbers (1,434 yards and 10 touchdowns passing, 344 yards and 4 touchdowns rushing).

Collaros was Cincinnati's starting quarterback for the 2010 season. He led the Big East in passing yards with 2,902 and touchdowns with 26. He was selected as the 2010 First-Team All-Big East quarterback.

Collaros was again named the starting quarterback for the 2011 season, his second full year as the starter.

Statistics

Professional career

Tampa Bay Buccaneers
Collaros signed with the Tampa Bay Buccaneers after going undrafted in the 2012 NFL Draft but did not make the team.

Toronto Argonauts
Collaros signed a contract to play for the Toronto Argonauts of the Canadian Football League in June 2012. He played in one game during the 2012 CFL season, completing seven of 11 passes for 101 yards and one touchdown. In the first preseason game of the 2013 CFL season he completed nine of 12 passes for 95 yards and one touchdown. On July 30, he had his first CFL start in place of the injured Ricky Ray, as the Argonauts defeated the B.C. Lions at the Rogers Centre. He threw for three touchdowns and completed 21 of 25 passes for 253 yards. Collaros had an outstanding 2013 season. He played in 14 games that season and was the starting quarterback for eight games, due to an injury to Ricky Ray. He completed 190 of 287 pass attempts at a strong completion percentage of 66.2%. He threw for 2,316 yards, 14 touchdowns and only six interceptions, for a quarterback rating of 98.4. He was not selected by the Ottawa Redblacks in the 2013 CFL Expansion Draft because he was set to become a free agent in February 2014. The Redblacks did not want to risk their selections on players who may not re-sign with their new team. Collaros was set to become a free-agent in February 2014 if a contract extension could not be agreed upon by the Argos. Upon understanding that Collaros would not re-sign with the Argos and would instead test the free-agent market, Argos general manager Jim Barker decided to release Collaros prior to the start of free agency. After failing to come to terms on a new contract, the Argonauts released Collaros on January 29, 2014.

Hamilton Tiger-Cats
On January 30, 2014, Collaros announced his intention to sign with the Hamilton Tiger-Cats. He signed a contract later that day to keep him in Hamilton through the 2016 season. In his first season with the Tiger-Cats Collaros started in 13 of the 18 regular season games and helped lead the Tiger-Cats to a 9–9 record (first-place in the East division) and took them all the way to the 102nd Grey Cup game; in which they were defeated by the Calgary Stampeders. Collaros came into form in the 2015 CFL season leading the Tiger-Cats to a record of 8–3 to start the season. In a game against the Eskimos on September 19, 2015, Collaros left the game with a leg injury and did not return to the field. It was announced two days later that he had suffered a torn ACL and would miss the remainder of the 2015 season. At the time of the injury Collaros was leading the league in passing yards (3,376), touchdown passes (25) and passer rating (113.7).

On May 4, 2016, Tiger-Cats head coach Kent Austin announced that Collaros would be limited in training camp, and likely miss the start of the 2016 regular season as he recovers from his torn ACL injury. On June 19, three days before the season commenced, Austin confirmed that Collaros would not be starting the season as he continued to rehab his knee. Prior to Week 8, and almost 11 months since sustaining his knee injury, Collaros returned to practising with the first team offense. Collaros made his season debut in time for the team's Week 8 match against the BC Lions. The following season, on August 29, 2017, after an 0–8 start to the 2017 season, Tiger-Cats head coach June Jones announced that Jeremiah Masoli would get the start at quarterback in Week 11 over Collaros. Collaros did not start another game for the Tiger-Cats in the 2017 season. By all accounts, 2017 was the worst season of Collaros' career. Not only did he not win a game, he also posted a career low quarterback efficiency rating of 88.1 and career low completion percentage (62.8%). His touchdown-to-interception ratio (8:7) was also the lowest of his career.

Saskatchewan Roughriders 

On January 3, 2018, Collaros was traded to the Saskatchewan Roughriders for a 2nd round pick in the 2018 CFL Draft. On January 19, 2018 Collaros agreed to a restructured contract with the Riders. Prior to the restructured deal Collaros was set to make $500,000 in 2018, plus a $200,000 roster bonus due February 1, 2018. Collaros suffered a concussion in the team's Week 2 loss to the Ottawa Redblacks. In the following week Collaros was placed on the six-game injured reserve. Collaros played in 14 regular season games during the 2018 regular season, leading the Riders to a 12-6 record and a home playoff game. Collaros was unable to play in the Western Semi-Final playoff game because of a concussion, and the Riders were defeated by the Blue Bombers 23-18, ending their season. Collaros re-signed with the Riders on the opening day of free agency, February 12, 2019, for a one-year contract. Collaros was knocked out of the first game of the season when he was hit in the head by Ti-Cats linebacker Simoni Lawrence while attempting to slide. Collaros was subsequently placed on the 6-game injured list.

Toronto Argonauts (II) 
On July 31, 2019, Collaros was traded to the Toronto Argonauts in exchange for a conditional fourth round pick in the 2020 CFL Draft. The pick could have been upgraded to as high as a second-round pick in that draft if Collaros had met playing time targets and extension clauses. In early September 2019, Collaros was still unable to participate in practice because of the concussion he suffered in Week 1. However, by the end of the month he was throwing the ball in practice.

Winnipeg Blue Bombers 
Collaros was traded to the Winnipeg Blue Bombers, on the CFL's 2019 trade deadline day, October 9, 2019, along with an exchange of draft picks in the 2020 CFL Draft. The Bombers had lost starting quarterback Matt Nichols to a season ending injury earlier in the season and the Bombers had lost four of their last five games with Chris Streveler under centre. Prior to the last game of the regular season, Collaros started taking first-team reps in practice for the Bombers, and was announced as the starting quarterback on October 24, 2019, taking over for an injured Streveler. Collaros threw his first passes of the year to count (his lone attempt for the Roughriders was wiped out due to a defensive penalty) and lead the Blue Bombers to a victory in their season finale. Collaros formed a QB tandem with Streveler, where Streveler served primarily as a gritty run option. The two turned what had been a late season slump for the Bombers, into a post-season winning streak that saw Winnipeg defeat the Hamilton Tiger-Cats 33-12 to win the 107th Grey Cup. Collaros' Grey Cup victory was unique in that he beat Saskatchewan, the team he started the season with in the division finals and then beat Hamilton, whose linebacker Simoni Lawrence had hit him in the head in Week 1 and knocking him out for a significant portion of the season, on his way to the championship. The media had frequently brought these circumstances up and Collaros did not answer them until the final media session after the Grey Cup saying "What are they calling it? The revenge tour? We finished it. It’s over. Last show tonight." On January 27, 2020 Collaros and the Bombers agreed to a two-year contract extension, preventing him from becoming a free agent on February 11.

Due to the cancellation of the 2020 CFL season, Collaros did not play in 2020. He entered the 2021 Winnipeg Blue Bombers season as the undisputed starter and completed 18 of 28 pass attempts for 217 yards and two touchdowns in the season-opening Grey Cup rematch against the Hamilton Tiger-Cats. He threw for a season-high 417 yards, the second highest of his career, and two touchdowns in a week 9 win over the BC Lions on October 1, 2021. The Blue Bombers clinched first place in the league in week 12 with three games remaining as Collaros had a 10–1 record as the team's starting quarterback. He finished the season having played and started in 13 regular season games, completing 243 passes out of 346 attempts for 3,185 yards, 20 touchdowns, and six interceptions. He had a 111.01 quarterback passer rating, which at the time was the 10th-best single season rating in CFL history. For his dominant year, he was named a CFL All-Star and the CFL's Most Outstanding Player. In Winnipeg's first West Final playoff game since 1972, Collaros completed 17 out of 21 pass attempts for 229 yards, one touchdown, and three interceptions in the victory over the Saskatchewan Roughriders. He then started in his third career Grey Cup game in the 108th Grey Cup championship, which was once again against the Hamilton Tiger-Cats. Collaros completed 21 of 32 pass attempts for 240 yards, two touchdowns, and two interceptions in the 33–25 overtime victory over the Tiger-Cats and he was named the Grey Cup Most Valuable Player. On January 20, 2022, Collaros and the Blue Bombers agreed to a one-year contract extension. Collaros continued his impressive play into the 2022 season leading the Bombers to a second consecutive first place finish in the Western Division. With three weeks remaining in the season, and a first-round bye already secured, the Bombers began resting Collaros for the playoffs. On October 18, 2022, the Bombers announced they had signed Collaros to a three-year contract extension, keeping him with the club through 2025. He ended the season leading the league in touchdown passes with 37 and highest touchdown rate (8.49%). His 116.20 quarterback passer rating, was the 4th-best single season rating in CFL history and he won his second consecutive CFL's Most Outstanding Player award. In the playoffs Collaros helped lead the Bombers to their third consecutive Grey Cup appearance where they were favored against the underdog Toronto Argo's. Hoping to become the first team in 40 years to win three consecutive Grey Cups, the Bombers lead 23-14 by the start of the 4th quarter. Unfortunately for Collaros they were ultimately upset by the Argo's who prevailed with a score of 24-23. Collaros played poorly in the game completing only 14 out of 23 pass attempts for 183 yards, one interception and no touchdowns, his worst performance of the season.

Career statistics

Personal life
Collaros and his wife, Nicole, own a home in Aurora, Ontario. The couple were acquainted through former Hamilton Tiger-Cats player Andy Fantuz and his wife Amanda, and they were married in February 2019.

He is of Greek Heritage, and is an avid and enthusiastic Greek dancer.

References

External links 
Winnipeg Blue Bombers profile
Zach Collaros stats on ESPN.com
Hamilton Tiger-Cats bio

1988 births
Living people
Sportspeople from Steubenville, Ohio
Players of American football from Ohio
American football quarterbacks
Canadian football quarterbacks
Cincinnati Bearcats football players
Toronto Argonauts players
Hamilton Tiger-Cats players
Players of Canadian football from Ohio
Saskatchewan Roughriders players
Tampa Bay Buccaneers players
Winnipeg Blue Bombers players
Canadian Football League Most Outstanding Player Award winners